The Tardenoisian (or Beuronian) is an archaeological culture of the Mesolithic/Epipaleolithic period from northern France and Belgium. Similar cultures are known further east in central Europe, parts of Britain.  and west across Spain. It is named after the type site at Fère-en-Tardenois in the Tardenois region in France, where E. Taté first discovered its characteristic artifacts in 1885.

Characteristic artifacts differ from earlier industries by the presence of geometric microliths, microburin, scalene triangles, trapezoids and chisel-ended arrowheads and small flint blades made by the pressure-technique. The term is also used for several microlithic industries and sites in northern Italy and Eastern Europe and to distinguish the northern French Tardenoisian sites from the Sauveterrian industry in southern France.

The Tardenoisian followed the Ahrensburgian, with which it was paralleled, and lasted from about 9.000 BC until 6.000 in the Neolithic.

Notes

Mesolithic cultures of Europe
Archaeological cultures of Central Europe
Archaeological cultures of Southwestern Europe
Archaeological cultures of Western Europe
Archaeological cultures in Belgium
Archaeological cultures in England
Archaeological cultures in France
Archaeological cultures in Germany
Archaeological cultures in Spain
9th-millennium BC establishments